This is a survey of the postage stamps and postal history of Lagos, now part of modern Nigeria.

Stamps
The first stamps of Lagos were issued on 10 June 1874. Stamps portraying Queen Victoria were issued until October 1902. In August 1893, an 1887 4d was overprinted "HALF PENNY". On 22 January 1904 a new design portraying King Edward VII was issued. Despite it being used for only 2 years, the set was issued twice with different watermarks. The last stamp was a 6d issued on 31 October 1905.

Amalgamation 
From 16 February 1906, Lagos became part of the Southern Nigeria Protectorate which then itself became part of modern Nigeria in 1914.

See also 
Postage stamps and postal history of Nigeria
Postage stamps and postal history of the Southern Nigeria Protectorate
Revenue stamps of Lagos

References

Further reading 
Proud, Ted. The Postal History of Nigeria. Heathfield, Sussex: Proud Bailey, 1995.

External links

The Stamps of West Africa by William Cochrane.

Philately of Nigeria
Postal history of Nigeria
History of Lagos